Events in the year 1841 in Brazil.

Incumbents
 Monarch – Pedro II

Events

Births
 15 February - Campos Sales
 17 August - Fagundes Varela
 4 October - Prudente de Morais

Deaths

References

1840s in Brazil
Years of the 19th century in Brazil
Brazil
Brazil